Tera Melos is an American math rock band from Sacramento, California, formed in 2004. They incorporate many styles of rock, ambient electronics  and unconventional song structures. They are currently a three-piece, consisting of guitarist/keyboardist/vocalist Nick Reinhart and bassist Nathan Latona, as well as drummer John Clardy who joined the group in 2008. Tera Melos play a brand of music characterized by quickly alternating rhythmic patterns, start-stop dynamics, improvisation, two-handed tapping on the guitar, extended open-ended bridges, and the use of effect pedals and samplers. Though the band has typically eschewed the label of math rock, they are considered recent innovators of the genre.

History

Early years (2004–2007) 
The band formed in 2004 after the breakup of Nick Reinhart and Nathan Latona's former band No Regard. Jeff Worms and Vince Rogers joined shortly thereafter. Tera Melos rehearsed for nearly a full year before choosing to debut live. The band had initially intended to recruit a vocalist but did not settle on one and chose to carry on as an instrumental band for the next several years. After releasing a four-song demo, their untitled debut full-length was released on October 4, 2005. The album is composed of eight tracks that are all instrumental. In 2010, it was re-issued on Sargent House. While some of the tracks on the album feature distorted vocals that are somewhat undecipherable, guitarist Nick Reinhart started contributing more prominent vocals to the music with the release of their 2007 split with By the End of Tonight, called Complex Full of Phantoms. The album was named one of the most overlooked albums of 2005 by AP magazine.

Right before they started recording their second EP Drugs to the Dear Youth, one of the guitarists, Jeff Worms, left the band. On January 19, 2007, Tera Melos released the EP on Sargent House. Called ‘Drugs’ for short, the EP took a step away from the band's previous sound into more progressive and original regions. They then embarked on their first national tour.

Later in the year, the band contributed five songs to a split EP with the Houston, Texas band "By the End of Tonight". Released on Temporary Residence Limited, Complex Full of Phantoms was the first release to feature prominent vocals in Tera Melos songs. Tours with By the End of Tonight and Facing New York followed.

Patagonian Rats (2008–2012) 
Tera Melos announced on their Myspace page on April 2, 2008, that drummer Vince would be leaving the band to pursue other things after their spring tour. He now performs solo drum act, with a sequencer, under the name the Blank Reference. He is also a member of Marnie Stern's band. The band began searching for a new drummer, and after six months announced the addition of John Clardy. Prior to Vince's departure, the band had been planning a long-awaited LP release after touring; however, plans for a full-length were delayed. In the meantime they ended up releasing an EP of covers, featuring songs by the Beach Boys and Polaris, entitled Idioms, Vol. I.

The band resumed live activity again in January 2009 and toured with the likes of RX Bandits, These Arms are Snakes, and Melt Banana in addition to headlining tours of their own.

Tera Melos have developed a cult-like fan base around the United States and have recently gained some popularity in Europe, Asia, and South America; in September 2009, the Drugs to the Dear Youth EP and Tera Melos songs from the Complex Full of Phantoms split were combined into the release Drugs/Complex on Parabolica Records in Japan. October 2009 the band did an 8-date headlining tour of Japan, and were subsequently featured in the DVD Parabolica Jam '09.

On November 7, 2009, Tera Melos confirmed a new album due out in 2010 in a Myspace bulletin. The post stated that the band was set to begin recording the next day, November 8. The new album, titled Patagonian Rats, was released on September 7, 2010. The band toured extensively throughout North America and Europe in support of the record, playing with bands such as Maps & Atlases and Marnie Stern.

The band embarked on a short west-coast tour with the recently reunited Firehose in April 2012.

X'ed Out  (2013–2016) 
On January 17, 2013, along with the release of a new song "Tropic Lame," Tera Melos announced their new LP X'ed Out, which was released by Sargent House on April 16. Tracks from the album "Sunburn" and "Bite" were later released. The band once again toured extensively in Europe, as well as a tour with Sargent House label-mates TTNG in the United States.

The band supported Minus the Bear on their West Coast dates. They have also since done extensive touring in 2014 traveling with Dillinger Escape Plan, and then again with Pinback.

During many of their 2014 shows they performed "Dyer Ln" and "Don't Say I Know", both of which would not see a release until 2017's Trash Generator.

Nick Reinhart was featured on Death Grips' instrumental album Fashion Week, as well as disc 2 of their double album The Powers That B and their fifth album Bottomless Pit.

Trash Generator (2017–present) 
In the final months of 2016, Tera Melos returned to the studio to record their first full-length album since X'ed Out. Drummer John Clardy left the  School of Rock (Company) of Southlake, Texas as the band finished sessions for a brand new album entitled Trash Generator. Before the album released, they toured with Chon and Covet, where they would perform "Treasures and Trolls", to appear later as a single.  The album was released on August 25, 2017 and typically received positive reviews. The band went on a U.S. tour that October with Speedy Ortiz.

"Treasures and Trolls", despite already having a presence in their setlist, did not release until late 2018—a full year after Trash Generator. The single also released with a b-side featuring Rob Crow and a digital bonus track, both of which were from the Trash Generator sessions.

At the end of 2018, Tera Melos went on a headlining tour with Mouse on the Keys. For personal reasons, Nathan had to cancel his appearances on the tour and was filled in for by long-time friend and contributor Pat Hills.

Musical style
Tera Melos's sound is labeled as math rock, experimental rock and punk jazz, with influences from progressive rock and post-hardcore. AllMusic critic Jason Lymangrover wrote that the band melds "the aggression of punk with the technical intricacies of prog rock," using "jerky shifts in time signatures and disjointed guitar noodling with a close resemblance to Don Caballero and Hella." The band's music also features tapped guitar parts, as well as angular bass riffs and splintered spazz-jazz drumming, complemented with ambient electronics and sparse vocal lines.

Starting with Patagonian Rats in 2010, the band began to infuse pop elements and harmonic singing to their sound, "making a shift from unconventional song structures of ambient-indebted post rock to hyper-technical guitar pop." Their third album, X'ed Out (2013), incorporated influences from skate punk, dream pop, and proto-emo.

Members

Current
 Nick Reinhart – guitar, vocals, programming (2004–present)
 Nathan Latona – bass (2004–present)
 John Clardy – drums (2008–present)

Former 
 Jeff Worms – guitar (2004–2006)
 Vince Rogers – drums (2004–2008)

Discography

Studio albums
Untitled (2005) Springman, reissued (2010) Sargent House
Patagonian Rats (2010) Sargent House
X'ed Out (2013) Sargent House
Trash Generator (2017) Sargent House

Compilation albums 
 Drugs/Complex (2010) Sargent House

EPs
 Demo (2004)
 Alive (2005) Drugs to the Dear Youth (2007) Sargent House IDIOMS vol. I (2009) Sargent HouseFrozen Zoo Remixes (2010) Sargent House Zoo Weather (2011) Sargent House Echo on the Hills of Knebworth (2011) Sargent HouseX'ed Out-The Remixes (2013) Sargent HouseTreasures and Trolls (2018) Sargent House

SplitsComplex Full of Phantoms (split with By the End of Tonight) (2007) Temporary Residence Limited

Music videos "Hey Sandy" (2009) "The Skin Surf" (2010) "Frozen Zoo" (2010) "Manar the Magic" (2011) "Kelley" (2011) "So Occult" / "Kelly" (2011)
"Bite" (2013) "Weird Circles" (2013) "''Slimed" (2014)
 "Sunburn" (2014)
 "Trash Generator" (2017)
 "Warpless Run" (2017)

References

External links
Official website
Tera Melos on MySpace
Tera Melos on Sargent House

American experimental rock groups
Musical groups from Sacramento, California
Math rock groups
American musical trios
Rock music groups from California
Temporary Residence Limited artists